As of 2021, there are twelve billionaires in the Netherlands, according to Forbes.

2021 Dutch billionaires list

See also
Lists of billionaires
List of countries by the number of billionaires
Lists of people by nationality
List of Dutch people

References

External links
Forbes.com: Forbes World's Richest People - By country of citizenship
Forbes.com: Forbes World's Richest People - By country of residence

Lists of people by wealth
 
Net worth